Hilary Edson (born October 17, 1962) is an actress who has appeared in several daytime television soap operas.  From 1984 to 1987, she played Tania Roskov Jones on General Hospital.  She then portrayed Stacey Winthrop on Another World from 1989 to 1991.  She began a three-year stint on Guiding Light in 1992 as Eve Guthrie and was nominated for a Daytime Emmy Award for Best Supporting Actress in 1994.

References
 

American television actresses
American soap opera actresses
Living people
1962 births
21st-century American women